Jerome Xaba (born 12 October 1995) is a South African cricketer. He made his first-class debut on 16 March 2021, for Northern Cape in the 2020–21 CSA 3-Day Provincial Cup. He made his Twenty20 debut on 24 September 2021, for Northern Cape in the 2021–22 CSA Provincial T20 Knock-Out tournament.

References

External links
 

1995 births
Living people
South African cricketers
Northern Cape cricketers
Place of birth missing (living people)